The 1962 Ohio gubernatorial election was held on November 6, 1962. Republican nominee Jim Rhodes defeated Democratic incumbent Michael DiSalle with 58.92% of the vote.

Primary elections
Primary elections were held on May 8, 1962.

Democratic primary

Candidates
Michael DiSalle, incumbent Governor
Mark McElroy, Ohio Attorney General
Alexander G. Metrakos

Results

Republican primary

Candidates
Jim Rhodes, Ohio State Auditor
William L. White

Results

General election

Candidates
Jim Rhodes, Republican 
Michael DiSalle, Democratic

Results

References

1962
Ohio
Gubernatorial
November 1962 events in the United States